A hive may refer to a beehive,  an enclosed structure in which some honey bee species live and raise their young.

Hive or hives may also refer to:

Arts
 Hive (game), an abstract-strategy board game published in 2001
 "Hive" (song), a 2013 song by Earl Sweatshirt featuring Vince Staples and Casey Veggies
 Hive (album), a 2022 album by alternative singer, producer, songwriter Sub Urban
 "Hives", a song by IBOPA and later covered by Xiu Xiu as "Hives Hives" on the album Knife Play
 H.I.V.E. ("Hierarchy of International Vengeance and Extermination"), a DC Comics villain organization
 H.I.V.E. (series) ("Higher Institute of Villainous Education"), a series of young-adult novels
 Hive Propolis, stylized as hive | Propolis, a science fiction transmedia series
 Hive (comics), a Marvel Comics villain and character on Agents of S.H.I.E.L.D.
 The Hives, a Swedish rock band

Business
 Hive (company), artificial intelligence services for businesses, known for content moderation
 HIVE (ISP), an ISP in Iceland, founded in 2004
 Hive Social, a social network

Film and television
 The Hive (2008 film), a 2008 film
 The Hive (2014 film), a 2014 film
 Hives (film), a 2012 Croatian film
 Hive (film), a 2021 Kosovan film
 MTV Hive, a former web portal operated by MTV
 The Hive, an online component of Vanity Fair (magazine)
 The Hive, an alien race in the television series Dark Skies

People
Hives (surname)

Places
 Hive, East Riding of Yorkshire, England
 Vestfold University College (Høgskolen i Vestfold, HiVe), a Norwegian university college

Medicine
 Hives, also called urticaria, a common form of skin rash
 HIVE, HIV (human immunodeficiency virus) encephalitis

Technology
 Hive, a highest-level logical section in the Windows Registry
 Apache Hive, a data warehouse infrastructure built on top of Hadoop
 Hive Connected Home, a home automation platform
 High-performance Integrated Virtual Environment, a computing environment used to process biological data
 HIVE (virtual environment), a research project at Miami University
 Hive UI, a custom ROM for the Android operating system

Other
 Hive (1820), a 485-ton sailing ship built in 1820 at Deptford, England

See also
 The Hive (disambiguation)
 Hive mind (disambiguation)